Ray Jennings Clark (born December 3, 1990) is an American professional soccer player who last played as a goalkeeper for Oklahoma City Energy in the USL Pro.

Career

Early career
Clark played college soccer at numerous colleges between the period of 2010 and 2013.

Professional
Clark signed his first professional contract with USL Pro club Oklahoma City Energy on February 27, 2014.

References

1990 births
Living people
American soccer players
Tulsa Golden Hurricane men's soccer players
OKC Energy FC players
Association football goalkeepers
Soccer players from Oklahoma